James E. Taylor High School (THS) is a public high school in unincorporated Harris County, Texas, in Greater Katy. The school, in Nottingham Country, which serves grades 9 through 12, is part of Katy Independent School District. Established in 1979, Taylor High School is a Blue Ribbon School and is ranked among the best in graduation rates, SAT scores, college admittance, and AP scores in the nation. In 2013 the school was ranked the 536th "Best High School in the Nation" by Newsweek Magazine.

Namesake
The school was named for James "Jimmy" Edgar Taylor (1912–1997), superintendent of the Katy ISD for 31 years. During his tenure, Katy ISD grew from a Class A district to one which opened its second Class 5A high school in 1979, named James E. Taylor High School.

Awards and honors

Academics
5A Academic Decathlon National Champions: 1997, 2000
5A Academic Decathlon State Champions: 1995, 1997, 1998, 1999, 2000, 2001
National Blue Ribbon School: 1994, 1995, 1996
State nominee for the Presidential Award for Excellence in Mathematics and Science Teaching: 1999
Texas Business and Education Coalition Just For the Kids Honor Roll: 2003
Texas Education Agency Exemplary School: 1990, 1991, 1992, 1993, 1994, 1995, 1996, 1997, 1998, 1999, 2000, 2001, 2002, 2003
UIL 5A Academics State Social Studies Champions: 2005, 2007, 2008, 2011
UIL 5A Academics State Spelling Champions: 2011
UIL 5A Academics State Champions: 2004, 2007
UIL 5A Academics State Computer Science Champions: 2002, 2004, 2005, 2007

Engineering and science
TCEA State Programming Champions: 2005, 2008
American Computer Science League - International Competition First Place: 2006
HP Code Wars Champions: 2004, 2006, 2007, 2008
Texas A&M Regional Science Bowl champions: 2006

Athletics

State championships 

UIL  wrestling state champions (women): 2006, 2012
UIL  swimming and diving state champions (men): 2001, 2003 
UIL  soccer state champions (women): 2006
UIL  tennis state team champions: 1997, 1998, 2002
UIL  tennis state doubles champions (women): 2008, 2011
UIL  tennis singles champions (men):1999, 2004, 2007 2011, 2013

Notable alumni and staff

Arts and entertainment
Janeane Garofalo - comedian and actress
Mark Matejka - guitarist for Lynyrd Skynyrd
Emily Neves – voice actress

Athletics
Trevor Enders - former Major League Baseball pitcher
Eugene Espineli - former Major League Baseball pitcher
Jonathan Garcia - Olympic athlete
John Meloan - former Major League Baseball pitcher

Newsweek rankings
Newsweek Magazine annually compiles a list of "America's Top Public High Schools," and Taylor has been listed since its inception in 2003.
2014: 319 
2013: 536 
2012: 599 
2011: 259 
2010: 1,040 
2009: 1,116 
2008: 771 
2007: 798 
2006: 641 
2005: 479 
2004: Newsweek did not compile a list
2003: 377

Demographics 

The average household income zoning areas to James E. Taylor High School is 166,986, which is balanced by the higher 77094 zip code with an average income of 207,000 as compared to the 77450 zip code with an average income of 127,000. Taylor High School is in the upper 6.2 percent of Texas high schools for family income.

The school's racial makeup is 50.8% white, 23.3% - hispanic, 15.0% Asian and 6.8% black.

Feeder patterns
The following junior high schools feed into Taylor High School:
Memorial Parkway Junior High
McMeans Junior High
West Memorial Junior High (a very small portion)
The following elementary schools feed into Taylor High School:
Nottingham Country Elementary
Pattison Elementary
Memorial Parkway Elementary
Exley Elementary (partial)
Jeanette Hayes Elementary
Wolfe Elementary (partial)
West Memorial Elementary (a very small portion)

Taylor attendance boundaries were adjusted in 2010 so that all of McMeans Junior High School now attends Taylor High School.

References

External links

Educational institutions established in 1979
Public high schools in Harris County, Texas
Katy Independent School District high schools
1979 establishments in Texas